Alessandro was a bishop of Forlì.  He began his term in 1160.  It was during his administration of the diocese that the episcopal palace was built.

Sources
http://www.newadvent.org/cathen/06137a.htm

Bishops of Forlì
12th-century Italian Roman Catholic bishops